Gesundheit (German for health (de)) may refer to:

 A response to sneezing
 Gesundheit! (video game), a 2011 video game
 Gesundheit! Institute, an American health project
 Focus Gesundheit, a German TV channel
 Yaakov Gesundheit (1815–1878), Polish rabbi